Sandisfield State Forest is a Massachusetts state forest filled with rolling hardwood forests in the town of Sandisfield. It is managed by the Department of Conservation and Recreation. A highlight of the forest is York Lake, which was created from swampy ground by the Civilian Conservation Corps in 1935.

Activities and amenities
Lakes: The shallow, man-made York Lake offers a  swimming beach, fishing, non-motorized boating, boat ramp, picnic grounds, and restrooms. The lake is stocked with trout three times each year. West and Abby lakes also have fishing.
Trails: Trails available for hiking and cross-country skiing include the  York Lake Loop Trail.
The forest offers seasonal hunting. Black bears might also be seen within the park.

References

External links
Sandisfield State Forest Department of Conservation and Recreation

Massachusetts state forests
Parks in Berkshire County, Massachusetts
Sandisfield, Massachusetts